Vijay Anand (: born 7 March 1969), is an anti-corruption activist from Coimbatore in Tamil Nadu, India. Anand formed the 5th Pillar organization whose goal is to fight corruption in Indian politics by fielding candidates who stand against corruption.

Early life
Vijay Anand was born on 7 March 1969 in Coimbatore in Tamil Nadu. Anand went to the Government College of Technology (GCT) Coimbatore, India and later was employed as a software engineer.

5th Pillar

Anand formed the 5th Pillar organization in 2006 to fight against corruption in Indian politics. The organization's goal is to field candidates for the Parliament of India that take a stance against government corruption. The organization also plans to reach out to the segment of the population who abstain from voting due to the perceived lack of credible candidates.

Politics

Anand ran in the 2011 Tamil Nadu Legislative Assembly election as a candidate for the Lok Satta Party from the Coimbatore South district.

References

1969 births
Indian anti-corruption activists
Indian columnists
Living people
People from Coimbatore
Activists from Tamil Nadu